James Barry, 4th Earl of Barrymore (1667 – 5 January 1748) was an Irish soldier and Jacobite politician.

Early life
The son of Richard Barry, 2nd Earl of Barrymore and his wife Dorothy (née Ferrar), Barry succeeded his half-brother Laurence Barry, 3rd Earl of Barrymore to the Earldom of Barrymore on 17 April 1699.

Military career
Upon William of Orange's invasion of England, Barrymore came out for William against James II and was subsequently appointed lieutenant-colonel in William's army on 31 December 1688. After the outbreak of the War of the Spanish Succession in 1702, he purchased for 1,400 guineas the 13th Regiment of Foot from Sir John Jacob, 3rd Baronet (his brother-in-law) and became Colonel of the Regiment. He was in turn appointed brigadier-general (c. 1707), major-general (1709) and lieutenant-general (1711). He served under Lord Galway and was captured after the Battle of Almansa in 1707. Upon the accession of the first Hanoverian monarch George I and his proscription of the Tories in 1715, Barrymore was forced to sell his regiment.

Political career
Barrymore took up his seat in the Irish House of Lords in 1704 and was elected Tory MP for Stockbridge for the British House of Commons in the Tory landslide of 1710. He lost his seat to the famous Whig writer Sir Richard Steele in 1713 but regained it upon appeal. In 1715 he was elected MP for Wigan, which he held until 1747 apart from a break during 1727–34. In 1714 he was appointed to the Irish Privy Council.

Jacobitism
Barrymore embraced the Pretender's cause late in life. In 1740 he conspired with English Tories for a Stuart restoration aided by a French invasion and visited Cardinal Fleury to persuade him to support it. In 1743 Louis XV of France's master of horse, James Butler, 2nd Duke of Ormonde, travelled to London to meet Barrymore and other Tory peers to conspire to French invasion. The group also sent a communication to the French king through the Jacobite agent Francis Sempill, requesting support for a Frenco-Jacobite invasion. Barrymore was to be part of Charles Edward Stuart's council of regency should he successfully oust the Hanoverians. In February 1744 the British government discovered from a spy in their service in France the English members of the conspiracy and Barrymore was arrested. After the collapse of the Jacobite rising of 1745 the government decided not to prosecute Barrymore.

Personal life
He married, firstly, Hon. Elizabeth Boyle, daughter of Charles Boyle, 3rd Viscount Dungarvan and his wife Lady Jane Seymour, before 1703. They had two daughters and a son:
Lady Charlotte Barry (d. 1708)
Lady Anne Barry, married James Maule and died soon afterwards
an infant son (d. 30 May 1707)

He married, secondly, Lady Elizabeth Savage, daughter of Richard Savage, 4th Earl Rivers and Penelope Downes, in June 1706, unknown to her father. They had one daughter:
Lady Penelope Barry  (18 Apr 1708 – 13 Oct 1775), married General Hon. James Cholmondeley
Lady Elizabeth died in 1714 miscarrying a son.

He married, thirdly, Lady Anne Chichester, daughter of Maj.-Gen. Arthur Chichester, 3rd Earl of Donegall and Lady Catherine Forbes, on 12 July 1716 at St. Anne's, Soho, London, England. They had four sons and two daughters:
James Barry, 5th Earl of Barrymore (25 Apr 1717 – 19 Dec 1751)
Hon. Richard Barry (d. 23 Nov 1787)
Lady Catherine Barry (d. 1738)
Lady Anne Barry (d. 21 Mar 1758), married Mr. Taylor
Hon. Arthur Barry (1724 – Oct 1770)
Hon. John Smith-Barry (28 Jul 1725 – 1784), married Dorothy Smith in 1746 and had issue

Notes

1667 births
1748 deaths
James
Irish Jacobites
Somerset Light Infantry officers
17th-century Irish politicians
17th-century soldiers
18th-century soldiers
Members of the Parliament of Great Britain for English constituencies
British MPs 1710–1713
British MPs 1713–1715
British MPs 1715–1722
British MPs 1722–1727
British MPs 1734–1741
British MPs 1741–1747
Earls of Barrymore
Hulme Trust